The goldeneye shovelnose ray (Rhinobatos sainsburyi) is a species of fish in the Rhinobatidae family. It is endemic to north-western Australia (Monte Bello Islands to Melville Island). Its natural habitat is open seas.

References

Rhinobatos
Marine fish of Northern Australia
Fish described in 2004
Taxonomy articles created by Polbot